Canadian Fire Alarm Association or CFAA is a private company categorized under Contractors' Association and located in Markham Ontario, Canada. CFAA mission is to maximize the use and effectiveness of fire alarm systems in the protection of life and property in Canada. The company is a volunteer organization, which has been in operation since 1973 and founded by small group of Canadian fire alarm professionals, led by its four founders: Jack Duggan, Richard Morris, Gerry Landmesser and Allen Hodgson. The CFAA is listed in the National Research Council Canada Association. For numerous years the CFAA has been involved in the development and harmonization of various standards used in U.S. and Canada.

The Canadian Fire Alarm Association a governing body that ensure fire alarm technicians are properly educated and trained so that provide life safety installations that will not falter. As a governing body, many organizations will keep technicians in check by requiring them to hold membership with the CFAA.

References

External links 
 cfaa.ca

Fire detection and alarm